Erigeron jonesii is a North American species of flowering plant in the family Asteraceae known by the common name Jones's fleabane. It is found primarily in Nevada and Utah, with a few populations in southern Idaho.

Erigeron jonesii is a branching perennial herb up to 40 cm (16 inches) tall, forming a large taproot. Each branch can produce 1-4 flower heads, each with up to 52 white or blue ray florets surrounding numerous yellow disc florets.

References

External links
Photo of herbarium specimen at Missouri Botanical Garden, collected in the Wah Wah Mountains in Utah in 1982, isotype of Erigeron wahwahensis

jonesii
Plants described in 1947
Flora of the Western United States
Flora without expected TNC conservation status
Taxa named by Arthur Cronquist